The Roebuck-class ship was a class of twenty 44-gun sailing two-decker warships of the Royal Navy. The class carried two complete decks of guns, a lower battery of 18-pounders and an upper battery of 9-pounders. This battery enabled the vessel to deliver a broadside of 285 pounds. Most were constructed for service during the American Revolutionary War but continued to serve thereafter. By 1793 five were still on the active list. Ten were hospital ships, troopships or storeships. As troopships or storeships they had the guns on their lower deck removed. Many of the vessels in the class survived to take part in the Napoleonic Wars. In all, maritime incidents claimed five ships in the class and war claimed three.

Classification

The Royal Navy classed the Roebuck class as fifth rates like frigates but did not classify them as frigates. Although sea officers sometimes casually described them and other small two-deckers as frigates, the Admiralty officially never referred to them as frigates. By 1750, the Admiralty strictly defined frigates as ships of 28 guns or more, carrying all their main battery (24, 26 or even 28 guns) on the upper deck, with no guns or openings on the lower deck (which could thus be at sea level or even lower). A frigate might carry a few smaller guns - 3-pounders or 6-pounders, later 9-pounders - on their quarterdeck and (perhaps) on the forecastle. The Roebuck-class ships were two-deckers with complete batteries on both decks, and hence not frigates.

Design and construction
The Admiralty assigned the contract for Roebuck to Chatham Dockyard on 30 November 1769. Some seven years after the design was first produced, the Admiralty re-used it for a second batch of nineteen ships. The Admiralty ordered them to meet the particular requirements of the American War of Independence for vessels suitable for coastal warfare in the shallow seas off North America (where deeper two-deckers could not sail). The first five vessels of the class, and the later Guardian, had two rows of stern lights (windows), like larger two-deckers, though actually there was just the single level of cabin behind. Most, if not all, of the other ships of the class - from Dolphin onwards - had a 'single level' frigate-type stern.

Ships in class 

PROTOTYPE
 
 Builder: Chatham Dockyard
 Ordered: 30 November 1769
 Laid down:  October 1770
 Launched:  24 April 1774
 Completed:  4 August 1775
 Fate:  Broken up at Sheerness in July 1811.

WARTIME BATCH
 
 Builder: Henry Adams, Bucklers Hard
 Ordered: 14 May 1776
 Laid down: July 1776
 Launched: 17 December 1777
 Completed: 7 April 1778 at Portsmouth Dockyard
 Fate: Captured by a French squadron consisting of a ship of the line, two frigates and a cutter, off the Chesapeake 19 February 1781.
 
 Builder: Randall & Co, Rotherhithe
 Ordered: 3 July 1776
 Laid down: July 1776
 Launched: 29 January 1778
 Completed: 17 April 1778 at Deptford Dockyard
 Fate: Sold to be broken up 30 April 1802
 
 Builder: Robert Batson, Limehouse
 Ordered: 24 July 1776
 Laid down: 9 August 1776
 Launched: 14 May 1778
 Completed: 11 August 1778 at Deptford Dockyard
 Fate: Renamed Dromedary 1788 as storeship. Wrecked near Trinidad in August 1800 but with no loss of life.
  (i)
 Builder: John Barnard, Harwich
 Ordered: 9 October 1776
 Laid down: January 1777
 Launched: 8 October 1778
 Completed: 23 January 1779 at Sheerness Dockyard
 Fate: She was trapped at the Siege of Yorktown so her stores, men and guns were taken ashore; on 10 October 1781 heated shot from a French battery set her on fire.
 
 Builder: Chatham Dockyard
 Ordered: 8 January 1777
 Laid down: 1 May 1777
 Launched: 10 March 1781
 Completed: 11 May 1781
 Fate: Broken up in July 1817
 
 Builder: John Fisher, Liverpool
 Ordered: 16 April 1777
 Laid down: 28 June 1777
 Launched: 14 July 1779
 Completed: 2 January 1780 at Plymouth Dockyard
 Fate: Sold to be broken up 11 January 1816
 
 Builder: Edward Greaves, Limehouse
 Ordered: 2 February 1778
 Laid down: 18 March 1778
 Launched: 28 August 1779
 Completed: 5 November 1779 at Woolwich Dockyard
 Fate: Wrecked on an uncharted rock off Turks Island on 20 August 1790 with the loss of one man.

  (i)
 Builder: Randall & Co, Rotherhithe
 Ordered: 11 February 1778
 Laid down: 3 March 1778
 Launched: 4 March 1779
 Completed: 6 May 1779 at Deptford Dockyard
 Fate: Taken by American Bonhomme Richard, assisted by other vessels, and transferred to the French who employed her as a privateer; wrecked 1781 off Madagascar.
 
 Builder: Randall & Co, Rotherhithe
 Ordered: 20 May 1778
 Laid down: 11 June 1778
 Launched: 20 April 1780
 Completed: 15 July 1780 at Deptford Dockyard
 Fate: Broken up in March 1815
 
 Builder: John Baker & Co, Howden Pans, Newcastle
 Ordered: 26 February 1779
 Laid down: 18 August 1779
 Launched: 8 June 1781
 Completed: 15 October 1781 at Chatham Dockyard
 Fate: Sold to be broken up 11 January 1816

 
 Builder: James Martin Hilhouse, Bristol
 Ordered: 14 August 1779
 Laid down: March 1780 
 Launched:  18 October 1781
 Completed: 14 March 1782 at Bristol
 Fate:  Wrecked off Trincomalee, 2 August 1795.
 
 Builder: Thomas Raymond, Northam, Southampton
 Ordered: 3 December 1779
 Laid down: July 1780.
 Launched: 30 March 1782
 Completed: 15 June 1782 at Portsmouth Dockyard
 Fate: Renamed Camel 1788 as storeship. Broken up in December 1810.
 
 Builder: Edward Greaves, Limehouse
 Ordered: 29 March 1780
 Laid down: April 1781
 Launched: 11 July 1782
 Completed: 17 September 1782 at Deptford Dockyard
 Fate: Blew up (believed struck by lightning) off Sumatra 24 July 1798; four survivors.
 
 Builder: Henry Adams, Bucklers Hard
 Ordered: 13 July 1780
 Laid down: April 1781
 Launched: 20 January 1783
 Completed: February 1783 at Portsmouth Dockyard
 Fate: Broken up in August 1817
  (ii)
 Builder: James Martin Hillhouse, Bristol
 Ordered: 13 July 1780
 Laid down: May 1781
 Launched: 7 November 1782
 Completed: December 1782 at Bristol
 Fate: Sold to be broken up at Jamaica on 17 July 1826
 
 Builder: Robert Fabian, East Cowes, Isle of Wight
 Ordered: 13 July 1780
 Laid down: June 1781
 Launched: 27 November 1784
 Completed: 11 January 1785 at Portsmouth Dockyard
 Fate: Sold to be broken up 8 September 1836
 
 
 Builder: Robert Batson, Limehouse
 Ordered: 11 August 1780
 Laid down: December 1780
 Launched: 23 March 1784
 Completed: 20 May 1784 at Deptford Dockyard
 Fate: Collided with iceberg 24 December 1789 and of the 40 men and passengers who set out in boats, 10 survived; Guardian, with the remaining 61 crew, convicts and passengers, arrived at Cape Town in sinking condition 21 February 1790 and beached on 12 April during a gale; remains sold to be broken up 8 February 1791.
 
 Builder: Thomas Raymond, Northam, Southampton
 Ordered: 20 October 1780
 Laid down: June 1781
 Launched: 10 February 1785
 Completed: 10 March 1785 at Portsmouth Dockyard
 Fate: Broken up in March 1816
  (ii)
 Builder: James Martin Hillhouse, Bristol
 Ordered: 19 September 1781
 Laid down: May 1782
 Launched: 17 May 1783
 Completed: 5 February 1784 at Plymouth Dockyard
 Fate: Broken up in December 1805

Citations and references 
Citations

References
 Robert Gardiner: Ships of the Royal Navy: the 44-gun two-decker, in: Robert Gardiner (Hrsg.): Nelson against Napoleon. From the Nile to Copenhagen, 1798-1801. Chatham 1997, S. 85-87.
 
 

Ship classes